The Loren L. Chadwick Cottages are two cottages in the Linden Hills neighborhood of in Minneapolis, Minnesota, United States, situated roughly south of Bde Maka Ska and northwest of Lake Harriet. This area of Minneapolis was platted in 1882-83 as "Cottage City" by a local real estate developer, Louis F. Menage.

Loren L. Chadwick built these two cottages in 1902 at a cost of $300 each. The two cottages were rented out as summer homes for more than a decade before they were bought by individual owners. In 1972, a new owner joined the two cottages with an addition on the rear. The cottages were listed on the National Register of Historic Places in 1984. They are significant because although their design is simple, their survival demonstrates a good example of cottage architecture in Minneapolis. Despite their simplicity, the cottages have Carpenter Gothic detailing on the vergeboards of their gable and porch roofs.

References

External links
 Linden Hills Walking Tour:  Lake Calhoun/Cottage City, p. 5

1902 establishments in Minnesota
Carpenter Gothic architecture in Minnesota
Carpenter Gothic houses in the United States
Houses completed in 1902
Houses in Minneapolis
Houses on the National Register of Historic Places in Minnesota
National Register of Historic Places in Minneapolis